The 2020 Unibet European Championship was the thirteenth edition of the Professional Darts Corporation's European Championship tournament, which saw the top players from the four European tour events compete against each other. The tournament took place from 29 October–1 November 2020 at the König Pilsener Arena in Oberhausen, Germany, in front of smaller, masked, socially distanced crowds, having been moved from its original venue of the Westfalenhallen in Dortmund.

Rob Cross was the defending champion after defeating Gerwyn Price 11–6 in the 2019 final. However, he was beaten 6–3 by Martijn Kleermaker in the first round, as was top seed Joe Cullen in another upset, who lost to William O'Connor by the same scoreline.

Peter Wright won the tournament for the first time with an 11–4 win over James Wade in the final.

José de Sousa hit a nine-darter in his first-round match with Jeffrey de Zwaan, which he won 6–3.

Prize money
The 2020 European Championship has a total prize fund of £500,000, the same as its previous edition.

The following is the breakdown of the fund:

Qualification
The 2020 tournament continued the new qualification system used in the two previous editions: the top 32 players from the European Tour Order of Merit qualified for the tournament. The Order of Merit is solely based on prize money won in the four European tour events during the season, reduced from the planned 13 due to the COVID-19 pandemic.

As with the previous tournaments, players were drawn in a fixed bracket by their seeded order with the top qualifier playing the 32nd, the second playing the 31st and so on.

Glen Durrant (who would've been 23rd seed) had to withdraw from the tournament after testing positive for COVID-19 the week before, allowing William O'Connor to enter the tournament as the 32nd seed.

The following players qualified for the tournament:

Draw

References

2020
2020 European Championship (darts)
2020 in darts
2020 in German sport
October 2020 sports events in Germany
November 2020 sports events in Germany